Erdek (formerly known as Artàke) is a town and district of Balıkesir Province in the Marmara region of Turkey. The population was 34,000 in 2010. Located on the Kapıdağ Peninsula, on the north coast of the Gulf of Erdek at the south of the Sea of Marmara, Erdek is a popular domestic holiday destination with several hotels dating back to the 1960s. The surrounding area has a rugged geology and topography with evergreen wooded areas and large olive groves. It is dominated by Mt Dindymus (782m). 

In the summer ferries travel from Erdek to Avşa Adası, one of the Marmara Islands in the Sea of Marmara. The harbour overlooks tiny Zeytinlik island where there is a research station devoted to olives.

History

During the Hittite era it was known as Artukka. Later it became a colony of Miletus. Together with other Greek cities, it took part in the Ionian Revolt against the Persian Empire, but was burnt by the Persians; it seems unlikely that it was rebuilt in ancient times since Strabo does not mention it. In the Roman period it was known as Artace. After the abandonment of nearby Cyzicus, the town was re-inhabited in the early Middle Ages. In the late 7th century, it briefly hosted a Cypriot refugee population including the island's archbishop, and was known as Nova Justiniana. 

During the Ottoman period, Erdek was the centre of the Sanjak of Karasi. According to the Ottoman General Census of 1881/82–1893, the kaza of Erdek had a total population of 33,007, consisting of 29,165 Greeks, 3,070 Muslims, 300 Jews, 18 Armenians and 454 foreign citizens.

In the 1960s, before Bodrum and Marmaris became the places to go, Erdek was a fashionable holiday resort for Istanbul residents. The Pinar Oteli was the most popular place to stay then and is still in business today.

Twin towns — sister cities
Erdek is twinned with:

 Otranto, Italy since 2001

See also
 Erdek Naval Base
 Nea Artaki, Greece

References

External links
Erdek Otelleri
About Erdek Erdek, restaurant,otel,maps,motel,information content.
Erdek Tourism Tourism page with interactive map and panorama videos.
Erdek Oteller Pansiyonlar
Erdek Hotel

 
Towns in Turkey
Seaside resorts in Turkey
Populated places in Balıkesir Province
Port cities of the Sea of Marmara
Fishing communities in Turkey
Populated coastal places in Turkey
Districts of Balıkesir Province
Members of the Delian League
Former Greek towns in Turkey
Milesian colonies
Greek colonies in Mysia